Calefax is a Dutch reed quintet. The ensemble consists of five different reed instruments played by the musicians Oliver Boekhoorn (oboe), Ivar Berix (clarinet), Raaf Hekkema (saxophone), Jelte Althuis (bass clarinet) and Alban Wesly (bassoon).

Music
The group is described as a "classical ensemble with a pop mentality". They often perform standing up, regularly playing music from memory without sheet music. Calefax has commissioned over two hundred pieces for reed quintet, which it performs alongside arrangements of preexisting works. Their repertoire spans the entire history of music, including Renaissance music, Baroque music, Impressionism in music and Jazz.

Activities
Calefax gives dozens of concerts each season, travelling throughout the world. The group has worked alongside such acts as the Orlando Consort, Mad Cows Sing, pianist Ivo Janssen, alto Helena Rasker, mezzo-soprano Cora Burggraaf, jazz singers Denise Jannah and Astrid Seriese, the Tony Overwater Trio and choreographer Sanne van der Put. Calefax also gives masterclasses and workshops for amateur musicians and conservatoire students.

CD recordings
Calefax CDs have appeared on the German label MDG and Jazz in Motion. The group has so far published 17 CDs.

Awards and honours
Calefax received the Philip Morris Art Prize in 1997, the Kersjes van de Groenekan Prize in 2001 and the VSCD Classical Music Prize in 2005.

References

Chamber music groups
Dutch classical music groups
Musical quintets